was a sub-unit of the Japanese idol girl group Morning Musume and associated with Hello! Project. It was formed by Up-Front Promotion in November 1999 as the second sub-group of Morning Musume.

History 
Founded November 1999, the group initially consisted of Morning Musume members Kei Yasuda, Sayaka Ichii, and Maki Goto. Shortly after their formation, the group released their first single, "Chokotto Love," which sold more than 1 million copies.

After the release of the first single, on May 21, 2000, Sayaka Ichii graduated from both Morning Musume and Petitmoni. In order to fill the third member's position, their producer Tsunku placed 4th generation member Hitomi Yoshizawa into the group, forming the second generation. Petitmoni went on to release three more singles, with their only album, Zenbu! Petitmoni, released in August 2002. The album was a collection of all of their singles and B-side tracks, along with three extra tracks.

Goto graduated from both Morning Musume and Petitmoni in 2002. Shortly thereafter, Yasuda's graduation was announced for 2003. This sparked yet another formation change, in which Ayaka Kimura (of Coconuts Musume) and 5th generation member Makoto Ogawa were added. Yoshizawa became the new leader, but the new lineup never released a single; only a song entitled "Wow Wow Wow" and a remake of "Chokotto Love," which were included on later Petit Best compilation CDs.

The group went on an indefinite hiatus in 2003, and was effectively disbanded in subsequent years with Ogawa leaving to study English abroad in 2006, Yoshizawa graduating from Morning Musume in 2007, and Kimura leaving Hello! Project and Up-Front Agency in 2008.

Members

First generation 
 Kei Yasuda
 Sayaka Ichii
 Maki Goto

Second generation 
 Kei Yasuda (Leader)
 Maki Goto
 Hitomi Yoshizawa

Third generation 
 Hitomi Yoshizawa (Leader)
 Makoto Ogawa
 Ayaka Kimura (from Coconuts Musume)

Legacy

In 2009, Petit Moni was revived as a Hello! Project Shuffle Unit under the name . Its new lineup consisted of Cute members Saki Nakajima and Mai Hagiwara; and Erina Mano. The "V" in its name is for "victory." The group released songs for Hello! Project's compilation albums Champloo 1: Happy Marriage Song Cover Shū and Petit Best 10. They also performed as a concert-only unit until 2011. In 2013, they reunited for a one-off performance in 2013 for Hello! Project's 15th anniversary alongside Hitomi Yoshizawa.

Discography

Singles

Albums

Compilation tracks 
 Together! - "Chokotto Love (2001 Version)"
 Petit Best 3 - "Chokotto Love (2003 Version)"
 Petit Best 4 - "Wow Wow Wow"
 Chanpuru 1: Happy Marriage Song Cover Shū - "Kimi ga Iru Daki de"
 Petit Best 10 - "Pira! Otome no Negai"

Live Only Songs 
 Chokotto LOVE (Petitmoni V)
 BABY! Koi ni KNOCK OUT (Petitmoni V)
 Uwaki na Honey Pie (Petitmoni V)
 WOW WOW WOW (Petitmoni V)

References

External links 
 Petitmoni discography on the Up-Front Works website 

 
Japanese pop music groups
Japanese girl groups
Japanese idol groups
Hello! Project groups
Musical groups from Tokyo